Kamışlık is a village in the Sivrice District of Elazığ Province in Turkey. The village is populated by Kurds and Muhacir Turks and had a population of 116 in 2021.

The hamlets of Akarsu, Cami, Damlacık, Evyapan, Yağıztaş, Yiğitbaşı and Yüceler are attached to the village.

References

Villages in Sivrice District
Kurdish settlements in Elazığ Province